The 1994–95 UCLA Bruins men's basketball team represented the University of California, Los Angeles in the 1994–95 NCAA Division I men's basketball season. The Bruins were led by Jim Harrick in his seventh season as head coach. They played their home games at the Pauley Pavilion as member of the Pac-10 Conference. They finished the season 32–1, 17–1 in Pac-10 play to win the regular season championship. They received the conference's automatic bid to the NCAA tournament as the No. 1 seed in the West region. They defeated Florida International, Missouri, Mississippi State, and UConn to advance to the Final Four. There they defeated Oklahoma State and Arkansas to win the National Championship, marking the school's 11th title. It was their first title in twenty years and since the retirement of head coach John Wooden.

The team featured seniors Ed O'Bannon, Tyus Edney, and George Zidek; Ed's younger brother, Charles O'Bannon; and a pair of freshmen in Toby Bailey and J. R. Henderson (now known as J. R. Sakuragi). Little-used reserve Bob Myers is now general manager of the NBA's Golden State Warriors.

Roster

Schedule

|-
!colspan=9 style=|Regular Season

|-
!colspan=12 style="background:#;"| NCAA tournament

Source:

Rankings

Highlights

 February 26, 1995 – Ed O'Bannon had 37 points in UCLA's win over Duke, 100–77 at Pauley Pavilion.
 March 19, 1995 – Tyus Edney scored a full-court dash basket for a win over Missouri with 4.8 seconds remaining in the second round game of the NCAA championship tournament.
 April 3, 1995 – Ed O'Bannon scored 30 points and grabbed 17 rebounds and is named the tournament's Most Outstanding Player as the Bruins win the championship 89–78 over Arkansas. Cameron Dollar played 36 minutes and contributed eight assists and four steals while filling in for an injured Edney, who did not return after leaving with 17:23 left in the first half. The Bruins enjoyed the biggest lead 34–26 in the first half, but led only by a point at halftime 40–39.

Awards and honors
 Jim Harrick, Naismith College Coach of the Year
 Ed O'Bannon, NCAA Men's MOP Award, John R. Wooden Award, consensus first-team All-American

Team players drafted in the NBA

References

External links
1994–95 UCLA Bruins at Sports-Reference.com
1994–95 UCLA Men’s Basketball Roster
 

Ucla Bruins
UCLA Bruins men's basketball seasons
NCAA Division I men's basketball tournament championship seasons
NCAA Division I men's basketball tournament Final Four seasons
Ucla
NCAA
NCAA